Gloria Lerma Yatco  (June 22, 1922 – August 25, 2019), better known by her screen name Mona Lisa, was a Filipina film actress. Known by the screen name Fleur de Lis before and during World War II, she was one of the renowned Filipina actresses of the late 1930s and 1940s.

Career
She was paired with Ely Ramos in LVN Pictures' Giliw Ko, along with LVN's first leading actress Mila del Sol and Fernando Poe, directed by Carlos Vander Tolosa, where she made history as the first actress to appear in a Filipino film wearing a bathing suit.

After WWII, she came back to the limelight as Mona Lisa, top billed with Teddy Benavidez in ‘‘Kalbario ng Isang Ina’‘ (1946) and ‘‘Siyudad sa Ilalim ng Lupa’‘ (1949) opposite Fernando Royo.

Mona Lisa paired with some of the Philippines' finest actors of the 40s like Ricardo Brillantes in Batang Lansangan, Pag-ibig at Patalim (1948) opposite Teddy Benavidez and Hanggang Langit (1947) with the Philippine actor known as "The Great Profile" Leopoldo Salcedo.

In the mid-40s, Mona Lisa paired several times with Action/Drama actor Fernando Poe in movies like Intramuros (1946), ‘‘The 13th Sultan’‘ and ‘‘Sagur’‘, both in 1949.

Before the war struck Manila, Mona Lisa paired with famous debonair actor of the 40s Serafin Garcia in the movie Tinangay ng Apoy in 1940 and second lead only to the Philippines' newest screen siren of the early 1940s Paraluman opposite Fernando Poe.

Mona Lisa portrayed a war-shock civilian in 1952's ‘‘Ulila ng Bataan’‘ opposite Sampaguita Pictures girl wonder Tessie Agana and ‘‘Buhay Alamang (Paglukso'y Patay)’‘, along with Sampaguita actor Fred Montilla combined with premier actress Anita Linda also in 1952.

She resumed her film career in 1970 after an absence of nearly two decades, and remained active in the industry where she got a Best Supporting Actress Award for ‘‘Insiang’‘, and another Best Supporting Actress Award for the Metro Manila Film Festival in 1977 consecutively, where she portrayed a sex hungry mother of Insiang played by Hilda Koronel.

Some of her films from the mid to late 70s were as a supporting actress to lead actors such as Rio Locsin in ‘‘Risa Jones: Showgirl!’‘ (1979), ‘‘Atsay’‘ (1978) with Nora Aunor, ‘‘Pagputi ng Uwak, Pag-itim ng Tagak’‘ (1978) with Vilma Santos and Bembol Roco, ‘‘Mananayaw’‘ (1978) with Chanda Romero and Phillip Salvador, ‘‘Hindi Kami Damong Ligaw’‘ (1976) with Charito Solis, and ‘‘Itim’‘ (1977) with a promising talent and rising star Charo Santos.

Her last movie Mother Ignacia was released in 1998, in which she plays a nun in a Catholic church.

A book on her life and career in show business, Mona Lisa: A Portrait (From the Memoirs of a Grandmother), was published in 2013 by ABS-CBN Publishing Inc. Her granddaughter was the author.

Death
Lisa died in her sleep on August 25, 2019, at her home in Manila, three years after she was diagnosed with Alzheimer's disease, at the age of 97.

Awards
In 1983, she was nominated as Best Actress in 1983 for Cain at Abel
In 1999, she won as Gawad Urian for Lifetime Achievement Award
In 2005, she won as Lifetime Achievement for Gawad Lino Brocka award

Selected filmography

Bago lumubog ang araw (1930)
Ang pagbabalik (1937)
Walang pangalan (1938)
Mga sugat ng puso (1938)
Makiling (1938)
Dasalang perlas (1938)
Bukang liwayway (1938)
Bahay kubo (1938)
Ang magmamani (1938)
Giliw Ko (1939)
Dilim at liwanag (1940)
Tinañgay na Apoy (1940)
Datu-talim (1940)
Paraluman (1941)
Luksang bituin (1941)
Puting dambana (1941)
Palaris (1941)
Bayani ng buhay (1941)
Ang viuda alegre (1941)
Princesa Urduja (1942)
Intramuros: The Rape of a City (1946)
Kalbario ng Isang Ina (1946)
Barong-barong (1946)
Bisig ng batas (1947)
Hanggang langit (1947)
Maria Kapra (1947)
Batang lansangan (1948)
Matimtiman (1948)
Pag-ibig at Patalim (1948)
Sunset Over Corregidor (1948)
Outrages of the Orient (1948)
Krus ng digma (1948)
Forbidden Women (1948) - Princess Apamena
Siyudad sa ilalim ng lupa (1949)
Sagur (1949)
The 13th Sultan (1949)
Naglahong tala (1949)
Sundalong talahib (1950)
Dugo ng Bataan (1951)
Buhay alamang (1952)
Ulila ng Bataan (1952)
Blood of Bataan (1953) - Lolita Zalasar
Romantika (1970)
Romantiko (1970)
La Paloma: Ang kalapating ligaw (1974) - Soledad
Isang gabi... Tatlong babae! (1974)
Mga uhaw na bulaklak (1975)
Araw-araw, gabi-gabi (1975)
Hindi kami damong ligaw (1976)
Uhaw na Bulaklak, Part II (1976)
Insiang (1976) - Tonya
Itim (1976) - Aling Pining
Electrika kasi, eh! (1977)
Mananayaw (1978)
Pagputi ng uwak... Pag-itim ng tagak (1978) - Diding
Atsay (1978) - Lola
Sino'ng pipigil sa pagpatak ng ulan? (1979)
Risa Jones; Showgirl (1979)
Tanikala (1980)
Alfredo Sebastian (1981)
Oro, Plata, Mata (1982) - Lola Desta
Cain and Abel (1982) - Senora Pina 
Hulihin ang ... mandurugas (1983)
Minsan pa nating hagkan ang nakaraan (1983) - Tia Salud
Soltero (1984)
This Is My Country (1984) - Ina ni Turing
Napakasakit, kuya Eddie (1986)
Paano kung wala ka na? (1987) - Mrs. Ledesma
1 + 1 = 12 + 1 (1987)
Barbi: Maid in the Philippines (1989)
Babangon ako't dudurugin kita (1989)
Umiyak pati langit (1991)
Huwag mong salingin ang sugat ko (1991)
Chop-Chop Lady: The Elsa Castillo Story (1994)
Pagsubok sa hirap at ginhawa (1996)
Mother Ignacia - Ang uliran (1998) - Mother Ignacia (elder years)
GMA Telesine: Pariwara (2001)
Kiskisan (2003) - Bining
Camiling Story (2005) - Jenny (final film role)

Notes

External links

1922 births
2019 deaths
Actresses from Manila
Filipino child actresses
Filipino film actresses
Filipino silent film actresses
People from Tondo, Manila
Place of death missing
20th-century Filipino actresses
21st-century Filipino actresses